Kenneth William Keuffel (September 19, 1923 – February 19, 2006) was an American football coach.  He was the 25th head football coach at Wabash College in Crawfordsville, Indiana, serving for six seasons, from 1961 to 1966, and compiling a record of 28–20–5.

Head coaching record

College

References

External links
 Ken Keuffel's obituary
 

1923 births
2006 deaths
American football fullbacks
Penn Quakers football coaches
Princeton Tigers football players
Wabash Little Giants football coaches
High school football coaches in New Jersey
Phillips Academy alumni
Players of American football from New Jersey